Lefties is a three-part 2006 BBC documentary series investigating some aspects of the left of British politics in the 1970s. Lefties was produced and directed by Vanessa Engle. It was produced as a companion series to Tory! Tory! Tory! an overview of the New Right and Thatcherism. It was commissioned by Janice Hadlow as part of her tenure at BBC Four under the belief that 'serious television' was vital in driving ideas.

Notable interviewees 
The first episode includes interviews with Piers Corbyn and Michael Reid.

Episodes 
The series consisted of three episodes.

Reception
Andrew Billen writing in the New Statesman about "Property is Theft" admired Engle for being "fair to her subjects".
In The Independent, Tom Sutcliffe called it a "lovely programme".

See also 
 Left-wing politics
 Tory! Tory! Tory!

References

External links
 
 

2006 British television series debuts
2006 British television series endings
2000s British documentary television series
2000s British political television series
Squatting in the United Kingdom
Squatting in film
Anarchism in the United Kingdom
BBC television documentaries about history during the 20th Century